
Year 80 BC was a year of the pre-Julian Roman calendar. At the time it was known as the Year of the Consulship of Sulla and Metellus Pius (or, less frequently, year 674 Ab urbe condita). The denomination 80 BC for this year has been used since the early medieval period, when the Anno Domini calendar era became the prevalent method in Europe for naming years.

Events 
 By place 

 Roman Republic 
 Quintus Sertorius re-enters Iberia with a tiny army (2,600 men) and opens a successful campaign against the Sullan forces.
 Battle of the Baetis River: A force of Populares exiles under Sertorius defeat the legal Roman army of Lucius Fulfidias in Hispania, starting the Sertorian War; Quintus Caecilius Metellus Pius takes command on behalf of Sulla.
 Pompeii becomes the Roman colony Colonia Cornelia Veneria Pompei.

 Egypt 
 Ptolemy XII Auletes succeeds Ptolemy XI Alexander II to the throne of Egypt.
 Ptolemy XI marries Berenice III, but murders his bride for unknown reasons.
 Alexandria comes under Roman jurisdiction.

 By topic 

 Art 
 Roman artists begin to extend the space of a room visually with painted scenes of figures on a shallow stage or with a landscape or cityscape.

 Literature 
 Meleager publishes his Garland, the earliest known anthology of Greek poetry.

Births 
Scribonia, wife to the Roman Emperor Augustus (approximate date) (d. AD 16)

Deaths 
 Berenice III, queen regnant of Egypt (b. 120 BC)
 Caecilia Metella Dalmatica, daughter of Lucius Caecilius Metellus Dalmaticus (approximate date)
 Lucius Cornelius Chrysogonus, Greek freedman
 Ptolemy XI Alexander II, king (pharaoh) of Egypt
 Sang Hongyang, Chinese politician of the Han Dynasty
 Shangguan Jie, Chinese politician of the Han Dynasty
 Princess Eyi, Han Chinese princess

References